The Alto Paraná Atlantic forests, also known as the Paraná-Paraíba interior forests, is an ecoregion of the tropical moist forests biome, and the South American Atlantic Forest biome. It is located in southern Brazil, northeastern Argentina, and eastern Paraguay.

Geography

The Alto Paraná Atlantic forests are an interior extension of the coastal forests, extending across the southern portion of the Brazilian Highlands. The ecoregion extends from the mouth of the Paraíba do Sul River eastward along the Paraíba valley lying behind the coastal Serra do Mar, and further eastward and northward along the basin of the Paraná River and its tributaries, forming a complex mosaic with the surrounding ecoregions.
States, provinces, and departments
The ecoregion covers portions of the Brazilian states of Minas Gerais, São Paulo, Goiás, Mato Grosso do Sul, Paraná, Santa Catarina, and Rio Grande do Sul, the Argentine province of Misiones, and the Paraguayan departments of Alto Paraná, Amambay, Caaguazú, Caazapá, Canindeyú, Concepción, Guairá, and Itapúa.

Adjacent ecoregions
The Cerrado lie to the north and east (in São Paulo), entwining with the Paraná-Paraíba forests in a complex mosaic. The Serra do Mar coastal forests lie to the south, on the Atlantic side of the Serra do Mar range. The Alto Paraná Atlantic forests wrap around the north, east, and south of the Araucaria moist forests, which cover a higher-elevation portion of the plateau in Paraná, Santa Catarina, and northern Rio Grande do Sul states. The Uruguayan savanna lies to the south, and to the west lie the Southern Cone Mesopotamian savanna and the Humid Chaco in Argentina and Paraguay, respectively.

Climate
The winter dry season extends from April to September.

Flora
The main vegetation type is semi-deciduous forests, akin to the other interior forest ecoregions of the Atlantic forests. Approximately 40% of the trees lose their leaves during the winter dry season.

Protected areas
5.95% of the ecoregion is in protected areas. Protected areas include Iguazú, Caazapa, Cerro Cora,  Itatiaia, Ybycui, Ñacunday, San Rafael, and Saltos del Guairá national parks, and Caetetus Ecological Station, Paulo de Faria Ecological Station, Ybera Scientific Reserve, Alto Iguazu Wilderness Nature Reserve, Urugua-í Wildlife Reserve, and Marília Ecological Station.

See also
List of plants of Atlantic Forest vegetation of Brazil 
Ecoregions of the Atlantic Forest biome

References

External links

Atlantic Forest
Ecoregions of Argentina
Ecoregions of Brazil
Ecoregions of Paraguay
Ecoregions of South America
Forests of Brazil
Environment of Goiás
Environment of Mato Grosso do Sul
Environment of Minas Gerais
Environment of Paraná (state)
Environment of Rio de Janeiro (state)
Environment of Rio Grande do Sul
Environment of São Paulo (state)
Environment of Santa Catarina (state)
Geography of Piauí
Geography of Misiones Province
Alto Paraná Department
Amambay Department
Canindeyú Department
Guairá Department
Itapúa Department
.

Neotropical tropical and subtropical moist broadleaf forests